The "Happy Hundred", also known as the "100 Brothers", was a group of investors who owned the Philadelphia Eagles franchise of the National Football League from 1949 to 1963. The group was headed by Philadelphia trucking magnate James P. Clark, the majority owner.  Frank McNamee, the team president, and Clark rounded up 100 Philadelphia investors to invest $3,000 each to purchase the team for $250,000 from Alexis "Lex" Thompson on January 15, 1949. The Eagles won two NFL Championships while under ownership of the "Happy Hundred," in 1949 and 1960. By his death in 1962, Clark had owned twenty percent of the team and only 65 investors were left from the original "Happy Hundred". The "Happy Hundred" sold the club to Jerry Wolman in December 1963 for $5,505,000, and each investor received more than $60,000. One member of the "Happy Hundred", Leonard Tose, tried to buy the team from the majority owners in 1956 with a group of his own, but did not have success. He eventually bought the Eagles from Wolman in 1969 and owned the team until 1985.

Bill Mackrides, the starting quarterback for the Eagles in 1948, claimed that the "Happy Hundred" was a sham. He said, "That's all pure myth. It made for a good story and headlines but the truth is Lex Thompson sold about 60 shares to Jim Clark. Clark had a friend who owned another 20 shares. To this day, no one knows that."

Such an ownership group would not be permitted under current NFL bylaws, which requires that one general partner hold at least a 30% stake in the team and limits the number of people who can hold interest in a club organized as a corporation to 25.

References

Philadelphia Eagles owners
Nicknamed groups of sportspeople
American investors
Culture of Philadelphia